Saint Cecilia is the patron saint of musicians and church music in Catholic and Orthodox traditions.

Saint Cecilia, St. Cecilia or Santa Cecilia may also refer to:

Places
Santa Cecilia, a municipality in the province of Burgos, Castile and León, Spain
Santa Cecilia del Alcor, a municipality in the province of Palencia, Castile and León, Spain
Santa Cecilia Acatitlan, a Mesoamerican archaeological site in Mexico State, Mexico

Buildings and structures

Churches
St. Cecilia Catholic Church (Los Angeles), a church in Los Angeles, built in 1927 and consecrated in 1943
Saint Cecilia's Catholic Church (Brooklyn), a church in Brooklyn, New York, USA, built in 1891 and consecrated in 1901
Santa Cecilia in Trastevere, a 5th-century church in Rome, Italy
St. Cecilia Cathedral, the cathedral of the Catholic Archdiocese of Omaha, Nebraska, US

Other
Santa Cecilia Tower, a 17th-century tower in Gozo, Malta
St. Cecilia School (disambiguation) a number of schools

Arts and entertainment

Music
Santa Cecilia Academy, or Accademia Nazionale di Santa Cecilia, a music institution in Rome, Italy
Orchestra dell'Accademia Nazionale di Santa Cecilia, an Italian orchestra
St. Cecilia Mass (Messe solennelle à Sainte-Cécile), an 1855 composition by Charles Gounod
St. Cecilia: The Elektra Recordings, an album by Blue Öyster Cult, recorded 1970, released 2003
Saint Cecilia (EP), by Foo Fighters, 2015
"Saint Cecilia" (song), the title song
 St. Cecelia, a band that recorded the 1971 song "Leap Up and Down (Wave Your Knickers in the Air)"

Painting
Saint Cecilia (Artemisia Gentileschi), a 1620 painting by Artemisia Gentileschi
Saint Cecilia (Poussin), a 1628 painting by Nicholas Poussin